College Ranga is a 1976 Kannada language film directed by Puttanna Kanagal, based on a novel by B. G. L. Swamy of the same name, and starring Kalyan Kumar, Jayasimha, Leelavathi. The supporting cast features Lokanath, Musuri Krishnamurthy, B. R. Jayaram and Gode Lakshminarayana. The film highlights the ambience of a typical college campus, its politics and the students.

Cast 
 Kalyan Kumar as Professor Dr. Devayya
 G. K. Govinda Rao
 Anantharam Maccheri as Principal Somayya
 Jayasimha as Ramu
 Leelavathi
 Lokanath as Adavaiyya
 Padmashree as Gauri
 Musuri Krishnamurthy
 Gode Lakshminarayana as Clerk Rangaswamy
 B. R. Jayaram as Clerk / Stores in charge Cheluvaiah
 Venkat Rao as Seenappa
 Dikki Madhava Rao
 Yoga Narasimha—guest appearance
 Seetaram—guest appearance
 Uma Shivakumar—guest appearance

Soundtaack 

Uppu Thinda Mele Neera Kudiyale Beku
Kaleju Rangadalli Kalinga Sarpa Bandaithe

References

External links 
 

1976 films
1970s Kannada-language films
Films scored by T. G. Lingappa
Films directed by Puttanna Kanagal
Films based on Indian novels
Films set in universities and colleges